Federal Republican Party may refer to:
Federal Republican Party (Brazil)
Federal Republican Party of Las Villas, Cuba
Federal Democratic Republican Party of Spain